The elongate bitterling (Acheilognathus elongatus) is a species of freshwater fish in the family Cyprinidae. It is found only in shallow water areas along the shores of Lake Dianchi in China.

It has a silvery-white body with an olive dorsal surface and a black stripe along the side.

The fish is currently listed as critically endangered because its tiny range of  within Lake Dianchi is threatened due to water pollution, which causes the destruction of its bivalves, which are essential for hatching its eggs. Likewise, artificial dykes and the enclosing of lakes for farmland is causing degradation of its habitat. It had likely disappeared by the 1980s, but further surveys are necessary to confirm its possible extinction.

References

Acheilognathus
Fish described in 1908
Endemic fauna of Yunnan
Freshwater fish of China
Taxonomy articles created by Polbot
Critically endangered fish